Mylo Hubert Claudio Vergara (born October 23, 1962) is a Filipino bishop of the Catholic Church. He is the second and current Bishop of Pasig, and he had previously served as the third Bishop of San Jose from February 12, 2005 to April 20, 2011.

Early life and education
Mylo Hubert Claudio Vergara was born on October 23, 1962 at Manila, Philippines. He studied elementary at the Ateneo de Manila Grade School and high school at the Ateneo de Manila High School. He took an undergraduate degree in B.S. Management Engineering and Masters in Philosophy at the Ateneo de Manila University, and he took licentiate in sacred theology at the Loyola School of Theology in the same university, and a Doctorate in Sacred Theology at the University of Santo Tomas.

Ministry

Priesthood (1990–2005)
On March 24, 1990, Vergara was ordained to the priesthood by Jaime Cardinal Sin, the Archbishop of Manila, at the Manila Cathedral.

After his ordination, Vergara served as the parochial vicar and acting parish priest of St. Andrew the Apostle Parish in Makati. From 1994 to 2001, he served as the rector of Holy Apostles Senior Seminary in Makati, where he also taught previously as Dean of Studies and Professor of Philosophy from 1990 to 1994. He also became the chaplain of the Chapel of the Eucharistic Lord at SM Megamall, Mandaluyong from 1999 to 2000 and of Santo Niño de Paz Chapel at Greenbelt, Makati from 2000 to 2003. He was also the Spiritual Director of Archdiocesan Association of Saint John Mary Vianney from 2003 to 2003. Then, he also became the parish priest of Saint Rita de Cascia Parish in Philamlife Homes, Quezon City from 2001 to 2004. In 2003, he was named Chancellor of the newly-established Diocese of Cubao, serving until 2004. He later served as parish priest of the Holy Sacrifice Parish in Quezon City and vicar for clergy of the Diocese of Cubao in 2005.

Bishop (2005–present)
Vergara was appointed as the third Bishop of San Jose on February 12, 2005 by Pope John Paul II and was installed on May 14 of that same year. On April 20, 2011, he was appointed as the second Bishop of Pasig.

In 2021, he was elected as Vice-President of the Catholic Bishop's Conference of the Philippines with The Most Reverend Pablo Virgilio David as President

References

External links

1962 births
Living people
21st-century Roman Catholic bishops in the Philippines
Ateneo de Manila University alumni
Filipino Roman Catholics
Filipino Roman Catholic bishops
University of Santo Tomas alumni